The Michigan Theatre at 124 North Mechanic Street in Jackson, Michigan opened in 1930 and was designed by Maurice Herman Finkel.  It was listed on the National Register of Historic Places on May 8, 1980, and is undergoing renovations as of 2005.

History
Construction on the Michigan Theatre began in 1928, as part of Col. W. S. Butterfield's theatre chain. The theatre was designed by Detroit architect Maurice Finkel. It is reported that the design incorporated a narrow commercial block already extant on Mechanic Street to house the entry. The Michigan Theatre was opened in 1930. It was built for the mainstream popular entertainment of the day, vaudeville and movies.  For just a few pennies, the public of the 1930s entered the building and were treated as royalty. As guests entered the exotic Spanish-styled building, they found lavish interior plasterwork of the 1930s, polychrome terra cotta facade, walnut furniture, wool carpets, oil paintings, heavy demask draperies, and exotic stained glass light fixtures. 

The original owner of the theatre, Butterfield Theatres, maintained the theatre until business ceased in 1978. The Michigan Theatre of Jackson, Incorporated acquired the theatre from the city of Jackson on August 24, 1993. The non-profit corporation continues to restore the building, receiving a Michigan Historic Preservation Award in 2012 for its restoration efforts. 

Today the theatre brings in classic films, art films, live theatre productions, concerts, meetings, and other community events. When the restoration is finished, the theatre will attract tourists to downtown Jackson and help the local economy. In 2012 The Michigan Theatre hosted over 300 events and continues to thrive via generous donations from many and excellence in programming.

Description
The Michigan Theatre consists of an auditorium building, located sixty feet from Mechanic Street, and a narrow entrance block that connects to the street. The entrance block is a three story structure, sixty feet deep and about twenty-five feet wide, faced with yellow terra cotta tiles. The facade has two paired Italian Romanesque-inspired windows and a Spanish Baroque tower with a red tile roof. A marquee, likely dating from the 1940s, hangs above the entrance. The block contains outer and inner lobbies, and a concession counter, on the first floor. There is office space on the second floor and a third-floor apartment, originally for the theater manager. The auditorium building is red brick, containing the auditorium measuring approximately 100 feet by 65 feet. It seats approximately 1600 people on the main floor and a deep balcony above.

References

External links
 Michigan Theatre

Buildings and structures in Jackson County, Michigan
Theatres on the National Register of Historic Places in Michigan
Theatres in Michigan
Event venues established in 1930
National Register of Historic Places in Jackson County, Michigan
1930 establishments in Michigan